Winston Churchill (November 10, 1871 – March 12, 1947) was an American best-selling novelist of the early 20th century.

He is nowadays overshadowed, even as a writer, by the more famous British statesman of the same name, to whom he was not related.

Early life
Churchill was born in St. Louis, Missouri, the son of Edward Spalding Churchill by his marriage to Emma Bell Blaine. He attended Smith Academy in Missouri and the United States Naval Academy, where he graduated in 1894. At the Naval Academy, he was conspicuous in scholarship and also in general student activities. He became an expert fencer and he organized at Annapolis the first eight-oared crew, which he captained for two years. After graduation he became an editor of the Army and Navy Journal. He resigned from the U.S. Navy to pursue a writing career. In 1895, he became managing editor of the Cosmopolitan Magazine, but in less than a year he retired from that, to have more time for writing. While he would be most successful as a novelist, he was also a published poet and essayist.

Career
His first novel to appear in book form was The Celebrity (1898). However, Mr. Keegan's Elopement had been published in 1896 as a magazine serial and was republished as an illustrated hardback book in 1903. Churchill's next novel—Richard Carvel (1899) — was a phenomenal success. The novel was the third best-selling work of American fiction in 1899 and eighth-best in 1900, according to Alice Hackett's 70 Years of Best Sellers. It sold some two million copies in a nation of only 76 million people, and made Churchill rich. His other commercially successful novels included  The Crisis (1901), The Crossing (1904), Coniston (1906), Mr. Crewe's Career (1908) and The Inside of the Cup (1913), all of which ranked first on the best-selling American novel list in the years indicated.

Churchill's early novels were historical, but his later works were set in contemporary America.  He often sought to include his political ideas into his novels.

In 1898, Churchill commissioned Charles Platt to design a mansion in Cornish, New Hampshire. Churchill moved there the following year and named it Harlakenden House. From 1913 to 1915, he leased it to Woodrow Wilson, who used it as a summer house. Churchill became involved in the Cornish Art Colony and went into politics, winning election to the state legislature in 1903 and 1905. In 1906, he unsuccessfully sought the Republican nomination for governor of New Hampshire. In 1912, he was nominated as the Progressive candidate for governor but did not win the election and did not seek public office again. In 1917, he toured the battlefields of World War I and wrote his first non-fiction work about what he saw.

Sometime after the move to Cornish, he took up painting in watercolors and became known for his landscapes. Some of his works are in the collections of the Hood Museum of Art (part of Hopkins Center for the Arts at Dartmouth College) in Hanover, New Hampshire, and the Saint-Gaudens National Historic Site in Cornish, New Hampshire.

In 1919, Churchill decided to stop writing and withdrew from public life. He was gradually forgotten by the public. In 1923, Harlakenden House burned down.  The Churchills moved to an 1838 Federal estate, part of the Cornish Colony called Windfield House (now called Hillside) at 23 Freeman Road in Plainfield, furnishing it with items saved from the fire.  In 1940, The Uncharted Way, his first book in twenty years, was published. The book examined Churchill's thoughts on religion. He did not seek to publicize the book and it received little attention. Shortly before his death, he said, "It is very difficult now for me to think of myself as a writer of novels, as all that seems to belong to another life."

Death
Churchill died in Winter Park, Florida, in 1947 of a heart attack.  He was predeceased in 1945 by his wife of fifty years, the former Mabel Harlakenden Hall. He is featured on a New Hampshire historical marker (number 16) along New Hampshire Route 12A in  Cornish.

Churchill and his wife had three children, including their son Creighton Churchill, a well-known writer on wines.  His great-grandson is the Albany, New York, journalist Chris Churchill.

The British statesman
In the 1890s, Churchill's writings first came to be confused with those of the British writer with the same name. At that time, the American was the much better known of the two, and it was the Englishman who wrote to his American counterpart about the confusion their names were causing among their readers.

They agreed that the British Churchill should adopt the pen name "Winston Spencer Churchill", using his full surname, "Spencer-Churchill". After a few early editions this was abbreviated to "Winston S. Churchill"—which remained the British Churchill's pen name. The two men arranged to meet on two occasions when one of them happened to be in the other's country, but were never closely acquainted.

Their lives had some other coincidental parallels. They both gained their tertiary education at service colleges and briefly served (during the same period) as officers in their respective countries' armed forces (one was a naval officer, the other an army officer). Both Churchills were keen amateur painters, as well as writers. Both were also politicians, although the British Churchill's political career was far more illustrious.

Works

Novels
Mr. Keegan's Elopement in magazine format (1896)
The Celebrity (1898)
Richard Carvel (1899)
The Crisis (1901)
Mr. Keegan's Elopement in hardback (1903) 
The Crossing (1904)
Coniston (1906)
Mr. Crewe's Career (1908)
A Modern Chronicle (1910)
The Inside of the Cup (1913)
A Far Country (1915)
The Dwelling-Place of Light (1917)

Other writings
Richard Carvel; Play produced on Broadway, (1900–1901)
The Crisis; Play produced on Broadway, (1902)
The Crossing; Play produced on Broadway, (1906)
The Title Mart; Play produced on Broadway, (1906)
A Traveller In War-Time (1918)
Dr. Jonathan; A play in three acts (1919)
The Uncharted Way (1940)

Filmography 
The Crisis (dir. Colin Campbell, 1916)
The Dwelling Place of Light (dir. Jack Conway, 1920)
The Inside of the Cup (dir. Albert Capellani, 1921)

References

Further reading
Charles Child Walcutt, The Romantic Compromise in the Novels of Winston Churchill (1951)
Warren Irving Titus, Winston Churchill (1963)
Ernest Erwin Leisy, The American Historical Novel (1950)
Grant C. Knight, The Strenuous Age in American Literature (1954)
Joseph L. Blotner, The Political Novel (1955)
Robert W. Schneider, Novelist to a Generation: The Life and Thought of Winston Churchill (1976)

External links

 The Churchill Society
 
 
 
 
 The papers of Winston Churchill at Dartmouth College Library

1871 births
1947 deaths
Writers from St. Louis
American essayists
19th-century American novelists
American historical novelists
New Hampshire Republicans
New Hampshire Progressives (1912)
United States Naval Academy alumni
Novelists from New Hampshire
20th-century American novelists
American male novelists
American male essayists
Novelists from Missouri
20th-century American male writers
Members of the American Academy of Arts and Letters